Bobrovec is a village and municipality in Liptovský Mikuláš District in the Žilina Region of northern Slovakia.

History
In historical records the village was first mentioned in 1231.

Geography
The municipality lies at an altitude of 634 metres and covers an area of 31.132 km². It has a population of about 1775 people.

Notable people 
The ski mountaineer Jozef Hlavco was born in Bobrovec.

Genealogical resources

The records for genealogical research are available at the state archive "Statny Archiv in Bytca, Slovakia"

 Roman Catholic church records (births/marriages/deaths): 1732-1900 (parish A)
 Lutheran church records (births/marriages/deaths): 1844-1895 (parish B)

See also
 List of municipalities and towns in Slovakia

External links
Official municipal website of Bobrovec 
Surnames of living people in Bobrovec

References

Villages and municipalities in Liptovský Mikuláš District